Miniodes is a genus of moths in the family Erebidae. The genus was erected by Achille Guenée in 1852.

Species
Miniodes discolor Guenée, 1852
Miniodes maculifera Hampson, 1913
Miniodes phaeosoma (Hampson, 1913)

References

Calpinae
Moth genera